Allura Red AC is a red azo dye that goes by several names, including FD&C Red 40. It is used as a food dye and has the E number E129.

It is usually supplied as its red sodium salt, but can also be used as the calcium and potassium salts. These salts are soluble in water. In solution, its maximum absorbance lies at about 504 nm.

Allura Red, FD&C Red No. 40 is manufactured by coupling diazotized 5-amino-4-methoxy-2-toluenesulfonic acid with 6-hydroxy-2-naphthalene sulfonic acid in an azo coupling reaction.

Use as a consumable coloring agent
Allura Red AC is a popular dye used worldwide.  Annual production in 1980 was greater than 2.3 million kilograms. It was originally introduced as a replacement for amaranth in the United States.

The European Union approves Allura Red AC as a food colorant, but EU countries' local laws banning food colorants are preserved. 
In the United States, Allura Red AC is approved by the FDA for use in cosmetics, drugs, and food. When prepared as a lake pigment it is disclosed as Red 40 Lake or Red 40 Aluminum Lake. It is used in some tattoo inks and is used in many products, such as cotton candy, soft drinks, cherry flavored products, children's medications, and dairy products. It is occasionally used to dye medicinal pills, such as the antihistamine fexofenadine, for purely aesthetic reasons. It is by far the most commonly used red dye in the United States, completely replacing amaranth (Red 2) and also replacing erythrosine (Red 3) in most applications due to the negative health effects of those two dyes.

Studies on safety

Allura Red has been heavily studied by food safety groups in North America and Europe, and remains in wide use.

The UK's Food Standards Agency commissioned a study of six food dyes (tartrazine, Allura red, Ponceau 4R, Quinoline Yellow, sunset yellow, carmoisine (dubbed the "Southampton 6")), and sodium benzoate (a preservative) on children in the general population, who consumed them in beverages. The study found "a possible link between the consumption of these artificial colours and a sodium benzoate preservative and increased hyperactivity" in the children; the advisory committee to the FSA that evaluated the study also determined that because of study limitations, the results could not be extrapolated to the general population, and further testing was recommended.

The European Food Safety Authority, with a stronger emphasis on the precautionary principle, required labelling and temporarily reduced the acceptable daily intake (ADI) for the food colorings; the UK FSA called for voluntary withdrawal of the colorings by food manufacturers. However, in 2009, the EFSA re-evaluated the data at hand and determined that "the available scientific evidence does not substantiate a link between the color additives and behavioral effects", and in 2014, after further review of the data, the European Food Safety Authority (EFSA) restored the prior ADI levels. In 2015, the EFSA found that the exposure estimates did not exceed the ADI of 7 mg/kg per day in any population.

The US FDA did not make changes following the publication of the Southampton study, but following a citizen petition filed by the Center for Science in the Public Interest in 2008, requesting the FDA ban several food additives, the FDA commenced a review of the available evidence, and still made no changes.

Allura Red AC was at one time banned in Denmark, Belgium, France, and Switzerland, and was also banned in Sweden until the country joined the European Union in 1994.  In Norway and Iceland, it was banned between 1978 and 2001, a period in which azo dyes were only legally used in alcoholic beverages and some fish products.

References

External links
 Allura Red AC on PubChem
 International Programme on Chemical Safety
 List of Foods and Drugs containing Red Dye #40

2-Naphthols
Azo dyes
Benzenesulfonates
Food colorings
Naphthalenesulfonates
Organic sodium salts
E-number additives